Alan Brodrick may refer to:

 Alan Brodrick, 1st Viscount Midleton ( 1656–1728), Irish lawyer and politician
 Alan Brodrick, 2nd Viscount Midleton (1702–1747), British peer and cricket patron
 Alan Brodrick, 12th Viscount Midleton (born 1949)

See also
 Sir Allen Brodrick (1623–1680), English politician